Touro University is a private Jewish university system headquartered in New York City, with branches throughout the United States as well as one each in Germany, Israel and Russia. It was founded by Bernard Lander in 1971 and named for Isaac and Judah Touro. Its main campus in New York City is the largest private Jewish university in the US,. Touro initially focused on higher education for the Jewish community, but it now serves a diverse population of over 19,000 students across 35 schools. There are many branches of Touro University, including Lander College for Men (an all-male college) and Lander College for Women (a separate all-women's college).

History
Touro received its first charter from the Board of Regents of the State of New York in 1971. Touro was initially headquartered at 30 West 44th Street.

Touro expanded to not only include its flagship branch Touro University in New York, but also the Touro Law Center, founded in 1980; the School for Lifelong Education, founded in 1989; Touro University California, founded in 1997; and the School of Health Sciences, founded in 1972; Touro has undergraduate offerings in Brooklyn, Queens, and Manhattan.

Touro has further expanded to include Touro University Nevada, Touro College of Osteopathic Medicine, Berlin, Moscow and Jerusalem, and Los Angeles. It previously had sites in Paris, France and Miami, Florida. Touro University Worldwide, founded in 2008, is the online branch of the university system.

Alan Kadish took over as president of the Touro system in 2010, and in 2011 the New York Medical College, in Valhalla, New York, was acquired by the Touro family. In August 2020, it was announced a membership agreement was signed with the New York College of Podiatric Medicine to join the university system. The transaction is expected to close on July 1, 2021, once it is approved by the U.S. Department of Education, the New York State Department of Education, other regulators and relevant accreditors.

The goal was to consolidate many of the college's schools, currently divided among at least 35 separate locations servicing 19,000 enrolled students, into a central Manhattan campus.

In February 2022, Touro College's charter was amended by the New York State Board of Regents to grant Touro university status.

Schools

Undergraduate schools

 Hebrew Theological College, in Skokie, Illinois
 Lander College for Men, in Queens, New York
 Lander College for Women, in Manhattan, New York
 Lander Institute Moscow
 Machon L’Parnasa Institute for Professional Studies
 New York School of Career and Applied Studies (NYSCAS)
 Touro University, New York, various locations in New York City
 Touro College Berlin
 Touro College Israel
 Touro College Los Angeles, West Hollywood, California
 Touro University Worldwide, Los Alamitos, California

Graduate schools

 New York Medical College, in Valhalla, New York
 Touro College of Dental Medicine, in Hawthorne, New York
 Touro Law Center, in Central Islip, New York
 Touro College of Osteopathic Medicine
 Touro College of Pharmacy, in Manhattan, New York

 Touro Graduate School of Education, in Manhattan, New York
 Yeshivas Ohr HaChaim, in Queens, New York
 Touro University Worldwide, Los Alamitos, California
 Touro University California, Vallejo, California
 Touro University Nevada, Henderson, Nevada
 New York College of Podiatric Medicine, in Manhattan, New York
 Touro College Illinois, Family Nurse Practitioner Program

Former schools
 Touro College South in Miami, Florida
 TUI University
 Touro University College of Medicine, in Hackensack, New Jersey (proposed, plans abandoned in 2009 and New York Medical College was purchased instead)

Notable alumni 
 Marc Alessi, politician
 David G. Greenfield, former member of the New York City Council
 Rivy Poupko Kletenik, educator
 Kenneth LaValle, politician
 Boyd Melson, boxer
 Dmitry Salita, former pro boxer
 Yehiel Mark Kalish, member of the Illinois General Assembly, 16th House District, (Graduate of Hebrew Theological College)
 Rachel Freier (born 1965), American judge

See also 
 List of Jewish universities and colleges in the United States
 Yeshiva University

References

External links

 
Universities and colleges in New York City
Orthodox Jewish universities and colleges
Educational institutions established in 1970
Universities and colleges on Long Island
Universities and colleges in Suffolk County, New York
1970 establishments in New York City